Chichibabin is a Russian surname. Notable people with the surname include:

Aleksei Chichibabin (1871–1945), Soviet/Russian organic chemist
Boris Chichibabin (1923—1994), Soviet poet

Russian-language surnames